Amphipneustes similis is a species of sea urchin of the family Temnopleuridae. Their armour is covered with spines. It is placed in the genus Amphipneustes and lives in the sea. Amphipneustes similis was first scientifically described in 1936 by Ole Mortensen, Danish zoologist.

See also 
Amphipneustes mironovi (Markov, 1991)
Amphipneustes rostratus (Koehler, 1926)
Amphipneustes tumescens (Koehler, 1926)

References 

Amphipneustes
Animals described in 1863
Taxa named by Ole Theodor Jensen Mortensen